"What" is a song and single written by H. B. Barnum, performed by Melinda Marx and released in 1965. Marx, daughter of Groucho Marx was a reluctant pop singer and the high notes on "What" found her straining. She recorded only one further single before leaving musical performing which had been foist upon her by her father.

Judy Street cover
In 1968 in Hollywood, California, Judy Street recorded "What", on the Strider label, as a B-side of "You Turn Me On". The record was exported to England and it was picked up by DJs at Wigan Casino, a major nightclub in the northern soul music scene. However, "What" became the track most played, going on to be a hit on the northern soul nightclub circuit and be ranked 23 of 500 northern soul singles. Following a resurgence of popularity for northern soul music in England in 1977, the song was re-released, and again in 1982 with a B-side by Hi-Fly. Street was unaware of the popularity of the song and did not tour the UK and from 1970 until 1990 she toured with her own bands, including The Swinging Society, in the US, singing and drumming.  Finally, in 2005 the popularity of "What" was acknowledged when Street did several interviews for radio, magazines and books.

Soft Cell cover

British synth-pop/new wave duo Soft Cell released a cover of the song in July 1982 as the only single from their remix album Non Stop Ecstatic Dancing. It became their fifth UK top-ten chart hit, peaking at number 3 on the UK Singles Chart.

Track listings
7"
 "What!" – 2:52
 "....So" – 3:45

7" (US)
 "What!" – 2:52
 "Memorabilia" – 5:22

7" (Canada)
 "What!" – 2:52
 "A Man Could Get Lost" – 4:05

12"
 "What!" – 6:15
 "....So" – 8:45

Personnel
 Marc Almond – vocals
 Dave Ball – backing vocals, synthesizers, producer ( only "....So")
 Don Wershba – engineering (on "What!")
 Harvey Goldberg – mixing (on "What!")
 Bill Clarke – engineering (on "....So")
Mike Thorne – producer (only "What!")
 Huw Feather – sleeve design and hand colouring
 Eugene Adebari – cover photography 
"What" recorded at The Camden Cell, London 
"....So" recorded in The Box, West Yorkshire

Charts

References

1965 songs
1965 singles
1968 singles
1982 singles
Songs written by H. B. Barnum
Vee-Jay Records singles
American soul songs
Northern soul songs
Soft Cell songs
Some Bizzare Records singles